Maskin may refer to
 A certain molecule in biochemistry, for which see Dictyate#Biochemistry mechanism.
 Aaron Maskin, an Israeli stage actor and recipient of the Israel Prize.
 Battle of Maskin, a battle of the Second Muslim Civil War in present-day Iraq
 Eric Maskin, a 2007 Nobel laureate in Economics.
 Maskin is also the Swedish, Danish and Norwegian word for Machine.